Roy Foster may refer to:

Roy Foster (American football) (born 1960), American offensive lineman
Roy Foster (baseball) (1945–2008), American outfielder
R. F. Foster (historian) (born 1949), Irish academic